This is a list of notable events in the history of LGBT rights that took place in the year 1984.

Events
 Laguna Beach, California, prohibits employment discrimination based on sexual orientation in the private sector.
 Oakland, California, prohibits employment discrimination based on sexual orientation in the private sector.
 In Australia, homosexual acts between consenting adults are decriminalized in New South Wales and the Northern Territory.

March
 14 — The United States Court of Appeals for the Tenth Circuit in National Gay Task Force v. Board of Education of the City of Oklahoma City rules that a statute allowing teachers to be fired for "advocating, soliciting, imposing, encouraging or promoting public or private homosexual activity in a manner that creates a substantial risk that such conduct will come to the attention of school children or school employees" is facially overbroad and infringes on First Amendment rights.

November 
 10 — In the United Kingdom, Chris Smith comes out as gay, becoming the first openly gay member of the House of Commons.
 29 — West Hollywood, California, approves a gay rights ordinance.

December
 5 — Berkeley, California, extends domestic partnership benefits to the same-sex partners of city employees.

See also

Timeline of LGBT history — timeline of events from 12,000 BCE to present
LGBT rights by country or territory — current legal status around the world
LGBT social movements

Notes

References
 Kenney, Moira (2001). Mapping Gay L.A.: The Intersection of Place and Politics. Temple University Press. .
 Rutledge, Leigh (1992). The Gay Decades. New York, Penguin. .

LGBT rights
LGBT rights by year
1984 in LGBT history